The Columbia County Courthouse, built in 1905, is an historic courthouse building located at 173 NE Hernando Avenue in Lake City, Florida. It was designed by architect Frank Pierce Milburn in the Classical Revival style of architecture. It was built with a dome and cupola, which were removed before 1989, but were restored in 2003 during a major renovation and expansion of the courthouse. In 1989, the Columbia County Courthouse was listed in A Guide to Florida's Historic Architecture, published by the University of Florida Press.

The Columbia County Courthouse is a contributing property in the Lake City Historic Commercial District.

See also

 List of buildings by Frank Pierce Milburn

References

Buildings and structures in Columbia County, Florida
County courthouses in Florida
Government buildings completed in 1905
Neoclassical architecture in Florida
Clock towers in Florida
Lake City, Florida
Historic district contributing properties in Florida
National Register of Historic Places in Columbia County, Florida
Courthouses on the National Register of Historic Places in Florida
1905 establishments in Florida